The Tabung Haji Tower is a 38-storey,  office skyscraper and is the headquarters of Malaysian Hajj Pilgrims Fund Board in Kuala Lumpur, Malaysia. The tower, designed by architect Hijjas Kasturi, was completed in 1984.

See also 
 List of tallest buildings in Kuala Lumpur

References

External links 
 Tabung Haji Website

Office buildings completed in 1984
1984 establishments in Malaysia
Postmodern architecture in Malaysia
Skyscraper office buildings in Kuala Lumpur
20th-century architecture in Malaysia